Neal K. Devaraj (born September 7, 1980) is an American chemist and professor at the University of California, San Diego (UCSD). His research interests include artificial cells, lipid membranes, and bioconjugation.

Education
Devaraj attended college at the Massachusetts Institute of Technology, where he performed research in the lab of Professor Moungi Bawendi. In 2007, Devaraj earned his PhD in Chemistry from Stanford University, where he worked in the labs of Professors James P. Collman and Christopher Chidsey.

Career and research
From 2007-2011, Deveraj completed a postdoctoral fellowship at the Harvard Medical School in the lab of Professor Ralph Weissleder. In 2011, Devaraj became a faculty member in the department of Chemistry and Biochemistry at UCSD, where he is currently the Murray Goodman Endowed Chair in Chemistry and Biochemistry.

Selected publications

Awards and honors
 2022 - Vannevar Bush Faculty Fellowship
 2022 - Bioconjugate Chemistry Lectureship Award 
 2021 - Tetrahedron Young Investigator Award 
 2019 - Leo Hendrik Baekeland Award 
 2019 - Guggenheim Fellowship 
 2019 - Eli Lilly Award in Biological Chemistry 
 2018 - Blavatnik National Laureate in Chemistry 
 2018 - Magomedov-Shcherbinina Memorial Prize
 2017 - ACS Award in Pure Chemistry 
 2016 - National Fresenius Award 
 2016 - Camille Dreyfus Teacher-Scholar Award
 2016 - NIH T1D Pathfinder Award 
 2013 - NSF CAREER Award

References 

American chemists
People from Manhattan Beach, California
1980 births
Living people